Hamburg-Bergedorf – Harburg is an electoral constituency (German: Wahlkreis) represented in the Bundestag. It elects one member via first-past-the-post voting. Under the current constituency numbering system, it is designated as constituency 23. It is located in southern Hamburg, comprising the boroughs of Bergedorf and Harburg, as well as the quarter of Wilhelmsburg from Hamburg-Mitte.

Hamburg-Bergedorf – Harburg was created for the 2002 federal election. Since 2013, it has been represented by Metin Hakverdi of the Social Democratic Party (SPD).

Geography 
Hamburg-Bergedorf – Harburg is located in southern Hamburg. As of the 2021 federal election, it comprises the entirety of the boroughs of Bergedorf and Harburg, as well as the quarter of Wilhelmsburg from Hamburg-Mitte.

History 
Hamburg-Bergedorf – Harburg was created in 2002 and contained parts of the abolished constituencies of Hamburg-Bergedorf and Hamburg-Harburg. Until the 2009 election, it was constituency 24 in the number system. Its borders have not changed since its creation.

Members 
The constituency has been held by the Social Democratic Party (SPD) since its creation. Its first representative was Hans-Ulrich Klose, who served until 2013. Metin Hakverdi was elected as his successor, and re-elected in 2017 and 2021.

Election results

2021 election

2017 election

2013 election

2009 election

References 

Federal electoral districts in Hamburg
2002 establishments in Germany
Constituencies established in 2002